The 15635 / 15636 Dwarka Express is an Express train of the Indian Railways connecting  in Gujarat and  in Assam. It is currently being operated with 15635/15636 train numbers on a weekly basis.

Coach composition

The train consists of 22 coaches:

 1 AC II Tier
 5 AC III Tier
 11 Sleeper coaches
 2 General Unreserved
 2 Seating cum Luggage Rake
 1 Pantry car

Service

15635/Okha–Guwahati Dwarka Express has an average speed of 48 km/hr and covers 3237 km in 66 hrs 50 mins.

15636/Guwahati–Okha Dwarka Express has an average speed of 53 km/hr and covers 3237 km in 61 hrs 00 mins.

Route & halts

The 15635/36 Dwarka Express runs from
 via 

Pt. Deen Dayal Upadhyaya Junction

New Jalpaiguri (Siliguri)

 to 
 and vice versa.

Schedule

Direction reversal 

The train reverses its direction at:

Traction 

See also 

 Ahmedabad–Patna Weekly Express
 Gandhidham–Kamakhya Express
 Sabarmati Express

References 

Transport in Okha
Transport in Guwahati
Railway services introduced in 2003
Rail transport in Gujarat
Rail transport in Madhya Pradesh
Rail transport in Uttar Pradesh
Rail transport in Bihar
Rail transport in West Bengal
Rail transport in Assam
Named passenger trains of India
Express trains in India